Marco Malvaldi (born 27 January 1974, in Pisa) is an Italian crime writer.

Short biography
Marco Malvaldi is an Italian chemist and novelist, who began his writing career in 2007 with his first mystery story La briscola in cinque (Game for Five, 2014), published by the Italian Sellerio Editore and featuring Massimo, the barista and owner of the cleverly named BarLume ("Bar Light", also a wordplay for "flicker, glimmer of light")  who is forced into the role of investigator in the fictional seaside resort town of Pineta, along the Tuscan coast. He followed up by other episodes in the series: Il gioco delle tre carte (2008, transl. Three-card Monte, 2014), Il re dei giochi (The King of Games) (2010), La carta più alta (The Highest Card) (2012). Another novel of his,  Odore di chiuso (The Scent of Must) (Sellerio, October 2011), a historical mystery with the renowned Romagna gastronomist Pellegrino Artusi as the amateur detective in 19th century Italy, was awarded the Isola d’Elba Award and the Castiglioncello Prize. This book was published in English under the title The Art of Killing Well (2014). In October 2011, Malvaldi also published a guidebook about his own hometown Pisa, with the title Scacco alla Torre (Checkmate to the Tower) (Felici Editore): one of the book's first stories is Finalmente soli (Finally Alone), narrating of a nocturnal walk, inspired by an image taken by professional photographer Nicola Ughi, Malvaldi's official portraitist and fellow citizen; the book was presented at the Pisa Book Festival. 

The four books comprising the BarLume series, have the same characters in each episode: the barista Massimo, the four aged regular patrons (Massimo's grandfather Ampelio, Aldo, Rimediotti, and Del Tacca – often speaking in the local Tuscan dialect), obtuse Inspector Fusco, and sexy bar assistant Tiziana. At end of October 2012, Malvaldi published a mystery thriller, Milioni di milioni (Millions of Millions) (2012), set in the fictional Tuscan town of Montesodi Marittimo, and with its main personages an odd couple of investigators – a university geneticist and a female archivist.

In July 2013 he was awarded the Italian literary prize "Premio letterario La Tore Isola d'Elba".

Malvaldi authored also books of popular science. His book Le due teste del tiranno. Metodi matematici per la libertà (namely, The Two Heads of the Tyrant. Mathematical Methods for the Freedom) (2017) won the third edition (2018) of Premio ASIMOV (Asimov award) for the best book in scientific dissemination published in Italy, in ex aequo with Helen Czerski's Storm in a Teacup.

Selected bibliography
(It. orig. only)
La briscola in cinque, 2007, Sellerio Editore
Il gioco delle tre carte, 2008, Sellerio Editore
Il re dei giochi, 2010, Sellerio Editore
Odore di chiuso, 2011, Sellerio Editore
"Sol levante e pioggia battente", 2011, on RCS Quotidiani - Corriere della Sera (short story)
 Short story in the Un Natale in giallo (A Xmas in Yellow) Anthology, 2011, Sellerio Editore
La carta più alta, 2012, Sellerio Editore
Milioni di milioni, 2012, Sellerio Editore
Argento vivo, 2013, Sellerio Editore
Il telefono senza fili, 2014, Sellerio Editore
La famiglia Tortilla, 2014, EDT
La battaglia navale, 2016, Sellerio Editore
A bocce ferme, 2018, Sellerio Editore

Translations
Game for Five, Europa Editions, 2014
Three-card Monte, Europa Editions, 2014
The Art of Killing Well, MacLehose Press, 2014

Notes

External links

Author's Biography 
Interview with the author 
Review, on La Repubblica 
Interview on Fahrenheit, a radio program on Radio3, 14 January 2009 
Interview on Fahrenheit, a radio program on Radio3, 7 February 2011 
Marco Malvaldi on RAI Letteratura 
REVIEW : The Art of Killing Well by Marco Malvaldi on Upcoming4.me

Living people
People from Pisa
Italian mystery writers
Italian male writers
1974 births